Benjamin Woods (born 9 June 1982) is a retired rugby union player who played for Newcastle Falcons and Leicester Tigers as  an openside flanker.

Woods started his professional career at Newcastle Falcons in 2003 but suffered a badly broken leg at the end of his first season and was sidelined for 18 months. On his return to the game he quickly made his mark on the Falcons first team and earned a call up to play for the England Saxons in the 2006 Churchill Cup.

He was also selected for 2007 Churchill Cup. Woods played in the Saxons side that defeated Ireland A on 1 February 2008 at Welford Road.

Woods left the Falcons and moved to Leicester Tigers in 2008 along with Toby Flood.

Injury to Lewis Moody allowed Woods to make his mark at Leicester and he played in 23 games for them in his first season, culminating in a try scoring appearance in the 2009 Heineken Cup Final. He also started that year's Premiership final as Leicester defeated London Irish. The following year he was a replacement as Leicester retained the Premiership.

Woods started in all three games of the 2009 Churchill Cup.

He captained Tigers for the first time in the vital LV= Cup win at Harlequins in 2011/12.

Retirement
On 5 September 2012, Woods announced via Twitter that he would be retiring from rugby due to a wrist injury.

References

External links
Tigers profile
Newcastle profile
England profile

1982 births
Living people
Alumni of Hatfield College, Durham
Alumni of Hughes Hall, Cambridge
Cambridge University R.U.F.C. players
Durham University RFC players
English rugby union players
Leicester Tigers players
Newcastle Falcons players
People educated at Queen Elizabeth Grammar School, Wakefield
Rugby union flankers
Rugby union players from Barnsley